The Eastern and Midland Region has been defined as a region in Ireland since 1 January 2015. It is a NUTS Level II statistical region of Ireland (coded IE06).

NUTS 2 Regions may be classified as less developed regions, transition regions, or more developed regions to determine eligibility for funding under the European Regional Development Fund and the European Social Fund Plus. In 2021, the Eastern and Midland Region was classified as a more developed region.

The Eastern and Midland Regional Assembly is composed of members nominated from the local authorities in the region. It is one of three Regional Assemblies in Ireland which were established in 2015 following an amendment to the Local Government Act 1991, replacing 8 Regional Authorities with 3 Regional Assemblies. It members are nominated from among the members of its constituent local authorities.

The Region contains three strategic planning areas, each of which is a NUTS Level III statistical region, and mostly correspond with the former Regional Authority Regions.

See also
Ireland's Ancient East

References

External links
Eastern and Midland Regional Assembly

NUTS statistical regions of the Republic of Ireland
Local government in the Republic of Ireland
Department of Housing, Local Government and Heritage